Institutional discrimination is discriminatory treatment of an individual or group of individuals by society or institutions, through unequal consideration of members of subordinate groups. 
These unfair and indirect methods of discrimination are often embedded in an institution's policies, procedures, laws, and objectives.
The discrimination can be on grounds of gender, caste, race, ethnicity, religion, or socio-economic status.

In the United States

Members of minority groups such as populations of African descent in the U.S. are at a much higher risk of encountering these types of sociostructural disadvantage. Among the severe and long-lasting detrimental effects of institutionalized discrimination on affected populations are increased suicide rates, suppressed attainment of wealth and decreased access to health care.

Institutional racism

Institutional racism (also known as systemic racism) is a form of racism that is embedded as normal practice within society or an organization. It can lead to such issues as discrimination in criminal justice, employment, housing, health care, political power, and education, among other issues.

The term "institutional racism" was first coined in 1967 by Stokely Carmichael and Charles V. Hamilton in Black Power: The Politics of Liberation. Carmichael and Hamilton wrote that while individual racism is often identifiable because of its overt nature, institutional racism is less perceptible because of its "less overt, far more subtle" nature. Institutional racism "originates in the operation of established and respected forces in the society, and thus receives far less public condemnation than [individual racism]".

See also
 Achievement gap
 Affirmative action
 Environmental racism
 Gentrification
 Harassment
 Institutional abuse
 Redlining
 Residential segregation
 Structural discrimination
 Structural violence
 Exclusionary zoning

References

Discrimination
Institutional abuse